Mohammad Shafi Bhat (1945–2016) was a politician from the Indian state of Jammu and Kashmir, who belonged to the National Conference political party, and was elected as the  Member of Parliament from Srinagar Lok Sabha constituency in 1989. In the 1996 Assembly elections he represented the Amirakadal seat. He later joined the Indian National Congress in 2002. By 2008, he had returned to the National Conference. He died on 12 October 2016 due to a prolonged illness.

External links

References

1945 births
2016 deaths
20th-century Indian Muslims
21st-century Indian Muslims
Jammu & Kashmir National Conference politicians
Kashmiri people
Lok Sabha members from Jammu and Kashmir
India MPs 1989–1991
Politicians from Srinagar
People from Srinagar